Orchard MRT station is an underground Mass Rapid Transit (MRT) interchange station on the North South (NSL) and Thomson–East Coast (TEL) lines, located on the boundaries of the Orchard and River Valley planning areas of Singapore.

Being the principal and one of the three MRT stations (the other two being Somerset and Dhoby Ghaut) that serve the popular shopping district along Orchard Road, Orchard station is one of the network's busiest stations. From 13 November 2022, Orchard station became an interchange with the Thomson–East Coast Line.

Opened in 1987, Orchard station was part of the early plans for the original MRT network since 1982. It was constructed as part of Phase I of the MRT network. Following the network's operational split, the station has been served by the North South Line since 1989.

History

North-South Line 
Prior to the construction of Orchard MRT station, it was named Scotts from 1967 to 1982, and then renamed to Orchard Boulevard. The station was subsequently renamed to Orchard in 1985. The name Orchard Boulevard would eventually be used as an adjacent station to Orchard on the Thomson–East Coast Line (TEL).

On 1 October 1983, the MRTC awarded the contract for the MRT tunnel from Newton to Somerset as well as Somerset MRT station to Borie SAE and Ong Chwee Kou Building Contractors Limited.

On 10 May 1984, Orchard Turn, the existing slip road from Orchard Boulevard to Orchard Road, was realigned to facilitate MRT construction works. On 27 April 1985, there was a MRT construction accident at Orchard MRT station which caused 15 workers to be treated for shock.

The construction of the lifts began on 19 June 2002 and completed on 20 August 2004. The lifts from the concourse to the street level existed for a short while before it was replaced by another lift in October 2007 due to ION Orchard's construction. Additionally, on 29 October 2006, the bus stop on the right side of Orchard Boulevard was shifted to Orchard Turn.

On 15 January 2008, Exits C and E that connects  to Wisma Atria and ION Orchard were closed, and reopened on 21 July 2009 due to the building works of ION Orchard. The western concourse, linked to Exit E and ION Orchard, opened on 20 July 2009 as part of the ION Orchard development.

Thomson-East Coast Line

On 15 August 2014, LTA announced that Orchard station would be part of the Thomson East-Coast line (TEL). The station will be constructed as part of Phase 3, consisting of 13 stations between Mount Pleasant and Gardens by the Bay.

Contract T219 for the design and construction of Orchard Station and associated tunnels was awarded to Penta-Ocean Construction Co Ltd – Bachy Soletanche Singapore Pte Ltd Joint Venture at a sum of S$498 million in July 2014. Construction started that very year, with completion aimed at 2021.

With restrictions imposed on construction due to the COVID-19 pandemic, the TEL 3 completion date was pushed by one year to 2022. On 9 March 2022, Transport Minister S Iswaran announced in Parliament that TEL 3 would open in the second half of that year.

The linkway between the TEL and NSL platforms was constructed using the pipe-roofing method, while the mining and underpinning method was adopted to construct the new box structure underneath the existing NSL station. Special drilling machines are being used, capable of drilling in all directions in a low headroom confined space.

To minimise any disruptions to the current NSL operations, mining works were carried out strictly according to the approved design, sequence and method in a safe manner without compromising the stability and serviceability of existing surrounding structures.

Unique to the station is an additional track siding that was built as part of the Thomson–East Coast Line platforms. Located alongside the northbound tracks, it is hidden by a concrete wall, allowing for a quick withdrawal and parking of trains heading northbound via the station. A similar feature was previously adopted in Mattar and Fort Canning MRT stations on the Downtown Line.

Station overview

North South Line 
Due to the station's location in the Orchard Road shopping belt, the station was intended to be the MRT system's showpiece, with S$24 million spent on aesthetic elements. The station's circular concourse has a dome  in diameter and an atrium design, and its floor consists of alternating granite tiles laid out in a radial arrangement.

To contrast with the concourse floor, burgundy red vitreous panels were installed on parts of the concourse wall, while other walls in the station concourse and at platform level were clad in polished blue granite tiles.

Thomson-East Coast Line 
The Thomson-East Coast Line features artwork as part of the Art-In-Transit Programme. The artwork, “Scotts Road/Orchard Road from ION Sky” by local artist Minito features a night view of Orchard Road and Scotts Road taken from a vantage point of ION Sky. It features night lights of supermarkets and malls in the vicinity, such as Isetan and Shaw House and Centre.

References

External links

 
 Changi Airport to Orchard MRT station train route

Railway stations in Singapore opened in 1987
Orchard Road
Orchard, Singapore
Mass Rapid Transit (Singapore) stations